Corofin or Corrofin may refer to:

 Corofin, County Clare, Ireland
 Corofin, County Galway, Ireland

See also
Corofin GAA (disambiguation)